The Pioneer Party, also known as the Leadership Party, is a civil political party in Egypt. The party was founded by former members of the Muslim Brotherhood. The party has decided to exclude former members of the National Democratic Party. The party joined in a coalition with the Wasat Party in Alexandria during the parliamentary elections held in 2011 and 2012.

References

2011 establishments in Egypt
Political parties in Egypt
Political parties established in 2011